Buddleja parviflora is large dioecious shrub or small tree endemic to much of upland Mexico north of the Isthmus of Tehuantepec, in forests at elevations of 750 – 3500 m. The species was first named and described by Kunth in 1818.

Description
Buddleja parviflora grows to a height of <10 m in the wild, with a trunk < 20 cm in diameter; the bark blackish and exfoliating. The young branches are subquadrangular and tomentose, bearing opposite subcoriaceous leaves of variable shape, 3 – 12 cm long by 1 – 4.5 cm wide. The white to greenish-white inflorescences are paniculate, 3 – 18 cm long by 2 – 12 cm comprising 2 – 3 orders of branches subtended by small leaves and bearing small cymules with 3 – 5 tiny flowers, the campanulate corollas 1 – 1.5 mm long. Ploidy: 2n = 76.

Cultivation
The species is uncommon in cultivation.
Hardiness: USDA zones 8–9.

References

parviflora
Flora of Mexico
Flora of Central America
Dioecious plants